Control is the third studio album by American singer Janet Jackson, released on February 4, 1986, by A&M Records. Her collaborations with the songwriters and record producers Jimmy Jam and Terry Lewis resulted in an unconventional sound: a fusion of rhythm and blues, rap vocals, funk, disco, and synthesized percussion that established Jackson, Jam and Lewis as the leading innovators of contemporary R&B. The distinctive triplet swing beat utilized on the record is also considered to be a precursor to the new jack swing genre. The album became Jackson's commercial breakthrough and enabled her to transition into the popular music market, with Control becoming one of the foremost albums of the 1980s and contemporary music.

Containing autobiographical themes, a majority of the album's lyrics came as the result of a series of changes in her life: a recent annulment of her marriage to singer James DeBarge, severing her business affairs from her father and manager Joseph and the rest of the Jackson family, hiring the A&M executive John McClain as her new management, and her subsequent introduction to Jam and Lewis. The album has been praised by critics as both an artistic feat and as a personal testament of self-actualization. It has also been regarded as a template upon which numerous female artists have modeled their careers, particularly Black women.

Following its release, Control became Jackson's first album to top the Billboard 200 albums chart in the United States and five of its commercial singles—"What Have You Done for Me Lately", "Nasty", "Control", "When I Think of You", and "Let's Wait Awhile"—peaked within the top five of the Billboard Hot 100 singles chart, making Jackson the first female artist to have five top five hits from one album on the Billboard Hot 100 chart; "When I Think of You" became the singer's first number one hit. Control also set a record for the longest continuous run of charting singles on the Hot 100, at 65 consecutive weeks. Music videos created to promote the album's singles showcased her dancing ability and became a catalyst for MTV's evolving demographics. The album remained on the Billboard 200 chart for over two years. It has been certified five times platinum by the Recording Industry Association of America (RIAA) and has sold more than 10 million copies worldwide.

Control went on to receive several accolades, including a nomination for the Grammy Award for Album of the Year and winning Producer of the Year, Non-Classical for Jam and Lewis in 1987. It is listed by the National Association of Recording Merchandisers and the Rock and Roll Hall of Fame as one of the 200 Definitive Albums of All Time, in addition to being included in several publications "best of" album lists. In 2016, it was selected for exhibition in the National Museum of African American History and Culture (NMAAHC).

Background 
Joseph Jackson, patriarch of the Jackson family of musicians, was known for managing the careers of all nine of his children – most notably, the successful career of The Jackson 5. After arranging a recording contract with A&M in 1982 for a then 16-year-old Janet, he oversaw the entire production of her debut album, Janet Jackson, and its follow-up, Dream Street (1984); the latter of which was written and produced by her brothers Marlon and Michael, and Jesse Johnson. Best known as a television actress, she was initially reluctant to begin a recording career. She said, "I was coming off of a TV show that I absolutely hated doing, Fame. I didn't want to do [the first record, Janet Jackson]. I wanted to go to college. But I did it for my father ..." and elaborated that she was often in conflict with her producers. Amidst her professional struggles, she rebelled against her family's wishes by marrying James DeBarge of the family recording group DeBarge in 1984. The Jacksons disapproved of the relationship, citing DeBarge's immaturity and substance abuse. Jackson left her husband in January 1985 and was granted an annulment later that year.

Jackson subsequently fired her father as her manager and employed John McClain, then A&M Records' senior vice president of artists and repertoire and general manager. Commenting on the decision, she stated, "I just wanted to get out of the house, get out from under my father, which was one of the most difficult things that I had to do, telling him that I didn't want to work with him again." Joseph Jackson resented John McClain for what he saw as an underhanded attempt to steal his daughter's career out from under him, stating, "I've worked hard for my family. The problem comes, though, when others come in behind you and try to steal them away. The wheels have already been set for Janet Jackson. Anyone who jumps on now will be getting a free ride." McClain responded by saying "I'm not trying to pimp Janet Jackson or steal her away from her father." He subsequently introduced her to the songwriting/production duo of James "Jimmy Jam" Harris III and Terry Lewis, former Prince associates and ex-members of The Time.

Composition and production 
When Jam and Lewis agreed to produce Jackson's third studio album, they wanted to appeal primarily to the African American community, in addition to achieving crossover success on the pop music charts. Jam commented in an interview with Rolling Stone magazine, "We wanted to do an album that would be in every black home in America ... we were going for the black album of all time." Before their association with Jackson, Jam and Lewis had originally planned to record an album with tracks they wrote for Sharon Bryant, but she found their lyrics and sound to be too "rambunctious". The duo presented the same set of recordings to Jackson, who gave her input and took co-writing and co-production credits for the album's content. Jam and Lewis recalled that to collaborate with Jackson on the material, they spent the first week simply getting to know their new client. Lewis explained, "We got into her head. We saw what she was capable of, what she wanted to say, where she wanted to be, what she wanted to be. We put together some songs to fit her as we saw her, as she revealed herself to us. It was as simple as that."

For the song "What Have You Done for Me Lately", which was originally penned for one of Jam and Lewis's own records, the lyrics were rewritten to convey Jackson's feelings about her recent annulment from James DeBarge. The song was chosen as the lead single for Control, as Jam and Lewis felt it best represented Jackson's outlook on life. "Nasty", which in Jackson's opinion was the most innovative song on the album, was inspired by her experience with street harassment in Minneapolis by a group of men outside the hotel she resided at during the recording of Control. She recalled, "They were emotionally abusive. Sexually threatening. Instead of running to Jimmy or Terry for protection, I took a stand. I backed them down. That's how songs like 'Nasty' and 'What Have You Done for Me Lately' were born, out of a sense of self-defense." Jimmy Jam wrote and played the keyboard arrangement, with Jackson playing the accompaniment. Background vocals were sung by Jackson, Jam and Lewis. The distinctive triplet swing beat of the song was developed by Jam on an Ensoniq Mirage keyboard. "Let's Wait Awhile" was centered on safe sex and abstinence, a subject of significant social commentary at the time. Jam commented that it is common practice for songwriters to use current events as a means of inspiration for lyrics and that the AIDS pandemic had raised awareness about sexually transmitted diseases. He commented, "The theme of the song ('Let's Wait Awhile') was Janet's idea. She's not a preachy person. She's not telling people how to live their lives. All she's doing is offering an opinion."

Although Joseph Jackson initially demanded that his daughter's new album be recorded in Los Angeles so that he could keep an eye out for her, Jam and Lewis refused. They required the entire production of the album to be done at their own studio in Minneapolis, Minnesota, "far from the glitter and distractions of Hollywood and the interference of manager-fathers." Jam stated, "We required that they put her in our hands. We had to do it on our turf, with no bodyguards, no star trips and none of Joe Jackson's people hanging around making suggestions." Control was recorded at Flyte Tyme Studios, the site for Flyte Tyme Records, founded by Jimmy Jam and Terry Lewis in Minneapolis. "There's a little radiator I used to sit on when we did the Control album," Jackson recalled in 1993. John McClain served as the executive producer.

Jam and Lewis were the primary instrumentalists for the recording, including percussion, piano, drums, and also provided background vocals. Jackson accompanied Jam and Lewis on keyboard and took part in composing the arrangements. Stephen Holden of The New York Times observed the album was a prominent example of the developing relationship with musicians and modern technology, stating "... technology has altered the form, shape, scale and even the meaning of popular music ... The album wasn't created by a studio band, as were most pop-rock albums in the 1960s and '70s, but by the producers and the singer programming mechanized drum and keyboard textures." Jackson's father disapproved of the new material and image of Control, claiming it would never sell. In a cover story for Spin magazine titled "Damn It, Janet: The Battle for Control of Janet Jackson," Joseph was reported saying "[i]f Janet listens to me, she'll be as big as Michael." She and McClain disregarded his objections. Commenting on the final product, Jackson stated: "It's aggressive, cocky, very forward. It expresses exactly who I am and how I feel. I've taken control of my own life. This time I'm gonna do it my way."

Album cover 
Fashion photographer and illustrator Tony Viramontes created the stylized cover for the new album and the singles "Nasty" and "Control". Jackson said of Viramontes, "He was very creative, and I believe one day his work will be iconic. He was such a joy to work with. I miss him." Author Dean Rhys Morgan in Bold, Beautiful and Damned: The World of Fashion Illustrator Tony Viramontes discusses how Jackson was "transformed from a former child star into an assured fashion forward figure with her trendsetting big hair and severe all black ensemble. Until this point, Jackson had been more a reflection than pioneer, more interpreter than innovator. This album was all about Janet and who she wanted to be." Alexander Fury wrote in The Independent, "the artwork created with Eighties illustrator Tony Viramontes for Control stands the test of time."

Release and promotion 

Although A&M did not consider a full concert tour to promote Jackson's album, the label funded a three-week promotional tour across the United States in 13 cities following its release. In addition to the studio release, a remix album, Control: The Remixes, was released in select countries in November 1987. Jackson's lyrical expression has been noted as one of the key elements of the album's success. Author Dave Marsh in The Heart of Rock & Soul: The 1001 Greatest Singles Ever Made (1999) comments: "Certainly, Janet must have written her own lyrics, which went after men—in particular, not very well disguised stand-ins for her father and former husband—more venomously than another guy would have dared. Control, the resulting album, was one of the best-sellers of 1986–1987, producing five hit singles."

Jesus Garber, then-director of A&M's black music marketing and promotion, noted that in addition to crossover promotion from black to pop music charts, music video was utilized to launch Jackson into superstardom. Eric Henderson of Slant Magazine credits the release of Control as "the birth of Janet the music video star, as six of the nine tracks were turned into popular videos that all but announced her as queen of the production dance number." Henderson commented that Jackson's dancing ability, trained by a then-unknown Paula Abdul, only served to propel her into further stardom. Charlie Minor, then-senior vice president of promotion for A&M stated: "The images completed the image of Janet Jackson with the buyer ... They gave her a face, dance, action identity with the songs, and a visual image of her as a rock 'n' roll star." Jonathan Cohen of Billboard magazine commented "[Jackson's] accessible sound and spectacularly choreographed videos were irresistible to MTV, and helped the channel evolve from rock programming to a broader, beat-driven musical mix." The video for "Nasty" received three nominations for the fifth annual 1987 MTV Video Music Awards, winning Best Choreography for Paula Abdul.

Commercial performance 

Control debuted at number 84 on the Billboard 200 on March 8, 1986, and at number 26 on the Top R&B/Black Albums on March 1, 1986. After twenty weeks, it topped the Billboard 200 and the Top R&B/Black Albums chart, selling 250,000 copies in a single week, a record for an album by a female artist. The Recording Industry Association of America (RIAA) first certified Control gold in April 1986, denoting 500,000 units shipped within the United States. Two months later, in June 1986, the album was RIAA certified platinum, denoting 1 million units shipped. Three years later, Control was RIAA certified fivefold platinum in October 1989. By 1990, Control had sold 5 million copies in the United States and as of December 2009, the album has sold 496,000 copies in the U.S. since 1991 according to Nielsen SoundScan, which does not count albums sold through clubs like the BMG Music, where she sold 883,000. Combined, it has sold over 6,379,000 copies in the U.S. Since its debut, Control has sold over 10 million copies worldwide.

The album's lead single, "What Have You Done for Me Lately", peaked at number four on the Billboard Hot 100 singles chart and at number one on the Hot Black Singles chart. The single was certified gold by the RIAA in November 1990. The song was compared favorably to similar recordings of female empowerment released by black women, such as "New Attitude" by Patti LaBelle, "Better Be Good to Me" by Tina Turner, and "Sisters Are Doin' It for Themselves" by Aretha Franklin. Oprah Winfrey commented: "What you're seeing in all the areas of arts and entertainment is black women internalizing the idea of black power and pride ... Black women started listening to their inner cues, rather than society or even the black community's idea of what they are supposed to be and can be." "Nasty", the album's second single, beat "What Have You Done for Me Lately" by one position, peaking at number three on the Hot 100 and at number one on the Hot Black Singles chart. It was certified gold in November 1990. Critic Jon Bream noted "the songwriters have slyly juxtaposed a nasty-sounding groove and the repetition of the word 'nasty' with a subtle antinasty message."

"When I Think of You" reached number one on the Hot 100, becoming Jackson's first single to top the chart, and was certified gold in November 1990. The album's fourth single and title track, "Control", reached its peak position at number five on the Hot 100 and at number one on the Hot Black Singles chart, later certified gold by the RIAA in November 1990. "Let's Wait Awhile" reached the number two position on the Hot 100 and number one on the Hot Black Singles chart. Clarence Page of the Chicago Tribune commented in a similar vein to "Nasty", the ballad "throw[s] cold water on the passions of young love 'before we go too far'." Unlike its predecessors, "The Pleasure Principle" did not reach within the top five of the Hot 100, instead peaking at number fourteen. It did, however, become Jackson's fifth number one single on the Hot Black Singles chart. Each of the album's singles excluding "Let's Wait Awhile" peaked within the top five of the Billboard Club Play Singles. "Funny How Time Flies (When You're Having Fun)" was not released as a commercial single in the United States. It peaked at number 59 on the UK Singles Chart.

Critical reception 

Upon its release, the album received widespread critical acclaim from critics. Rolling Stone's Rob Hoerburger commented that the "sharp-tongued" Janet Jackson is "more concerned with identity than with playlists", as Control declares she is no longer the Jacksons' baby sister. Hoerburger expressed the view that tracks such as "Nasty" and "What Have You Done for Me Lately" erased the former "pop-ingénue image" of Jackson's first two albums, and that "Control is a better album than Diana Ross has made in five years and puts Janet in a position similar to the young Donna Summer's—unwilling to accept novelty status and taking her own steps to rise above it." Steven Ivory of Billboard expressed "[v]ocally, Jackson is more aggressive than ever. Indeed, her exhibition of sass and funkiness is certainly more provocative" in comparison to her previous work. NME wrote: "Jackson has gone a long way in shaking off the experience of being a shadow Jackson child. She is an artist in her own right." Newsweek stated "[i]n an era of big-voiced pop-soul divas ... her current hit album, is taut, funky, hard as nails, an alternative to the sentimental balladry and opulent arrangements of Patti LaBelle and Whitney Houston." In The Village Voice, Robert Christgau "scoffed at Janet's claims of autonomy", but applauded Jam & Lewis's beats as "their deepest ever" while finding Jackson's contribution entertaining enough. Los Angeles Times critic Connie Johnson wrote: "Though still a teen-ager, this singer's stance is remarkably nervy and mature. She has a snotty sort of assurance that permeates several cuts, plus the musical muscle to back it up." Jon Pareles of The New York Times notes Control takes obvious influence from Prince, describing "[t]he album's pacing, its clipped vocal lines—even the spoken introduction that starts things off" as pure Minneapolis sound; he adds "[b]ut where the Prince style is usually connected with heavy-breathing come-ons, Miss Jackson is cheerfully standoffish."

For the 29th Annual Grammy Awards, Control received four nominations: Album of the Year, Best R&B Song for "What Have You Done for Me Lately", Best Female R&B Vocal Performance and Non-Classical Producer of the Year for Jimmy Jam and Terry Lewis. Jam and Lewis won Producer of the Year. The album earned a record-breaking twelve nominations from the American Music Awards, winning four. Jackson also won three Soul Train Music Awards and six Billboard Music Awards.

Later reviews continue to find the album favorable. Eric Henderson of Slant Magazine expressed that the misconception that Control is Jackson's debut album only confirmed the "quintessential statement on personal and artistic self-actualization" that it set out to accomplish. Henderson claimed critics who judged Jackson harshly for her thin voice "somehow missed the explosive 'gimme a beat' vocal pyrotechnics she unleashes all over "Nasty" ... Or that they completely dismissed how perfect her tremulous hesitance fits into the abstinence anthem "Let's Wait Awhile." However, Henderson also commented that the "Jam-Lewis formula wasn't completely infallible" as "You Can Be Mine" and "Funny How Time Flies (When You're Having Fun)", were two of the album's least impressive misfires. While William Ruhlmann of AllMusic commented Jackson "came across as an aggressive, independent woman", he asserts the album's true value is the production talents of Jimmy Jam and Terry Lewis. In The New Rolling Stone Album Guide (2004), Laura Sinagra said that on Control, "Jam and Lewis perfected their melodic, full-blown funk attack", while Jackson "filled each track with a breathy believability" with vocal performances that ranged from yearning to seductive.  In 2020, Rolling Stone ranked Control number 111 on the reboot of its list of 'The 500 Greatest Albums of All Time'.

Accolades

Legacy 

Control is widely considered to be the breakthrough in Jackson's career, establishing her independence and dominance in the realm of popular music. In The Sex Revolts: Gender, Rebellion, and Rock'n'roll (1996) author Simon Reynolds wrote that "Janet Jackson became a superstar with the immaculately designed soft-core feminism of Control." Jet magazine commented that although the Jackson family's musical legacy had given her an opportunity to tap into an international audience, Control was the turning point at which "her career took off and she became a bona fide superstar. Control showcased Janet as a person who was firmly and finally in control of her own life." Dennis Hunt of the Los Angeles Times wrote: "Previously, she had recorded two unsophisticated, kiddie soul albums. If you listened carefully to that kid stuff, there was a grown-up singer there somewhere struggling to get out. [Jimmy Jam and Terry Lewis] liberated the real Janet Jackson."

Lyrically, Jackson's album is said to exhibit a "politically driven feminist" message, as stated by Lilly Goren in You've Come A Long Way, Baby: Women, Politics, and Popular Culture (2009). Musically, according to Rickey Vincent, author of Funk: The Music, The People, and The Rhythm of The One (1996), Jam and Lewis's collaboration with her is said to be one of the high points of the 1980s, as they redefined dance music by mixing a youthful sound with industrial-strength beats. As documented by musicologist Richard J. Ripani, author of The New Blue Music: Changes in Rhythm & Blues, 1950–1999 (2006), Control is regarded as one of the most influential albums in the history of rhythm and blues and the first album to bridge the gap between R&B and rap music. Its success in both the mainstream R&B and pop music charts "led to the incorporation of many of the stylistic traits of rap over the next few years, and Janet Jackson was to continue to be one of the leaders in that development." Furthermore, the album's second single "Nasty" has been credited with influencing the new jack swing genre, pioneered by Teddy Riley. Laura Sinagra in The New Rolling Stone Album Guide wrote that the album impacted popular music with a "blockbuster momentum all its own", while Eric Henderson of Slant Magazine noted Control "was every bit the hit machine that her brother's Thriller was." Additionally, Control made Billboard Hot 100 history having the longest continuous run on the Hot 100 with singles from one album at 65 consecutive weeks, breaking her brother Michael's record by one week; Thriller by comparison charted singles for 64 consecutive weeks. Steve Morse of The Boston Globe commented: "All things considered, 1986 was a stellar year for the black female vocalist—the best, in fact, since the disco era of a decade back ... Black music crossed over to the pop charts in dramatic fashion, with Whitney Houston, Patti LaBelle and Janet Jackson each having No. 1 albums."

In addition to stepping out of the Jackson family shadow, Control established Jackson as one of the preeminent female artists of popular music, rivaling fellow pop star Madonna, as critics began to acknowledge their influence on the record industry and younger artists. Continuum Encyclopedia of Popular Music of the World Volume 8: Genres: North America (2012) documents that both women redefined house music, repackaging it "as part of a global metropolitan pop aesthetic." With regard to marketing singles, Paul Grein of Billboard reported: "10 or 20 years ago you would have had two singles from an album at the most. Now we're in an era where Madonna is on her fifth single from the album True Blue and Janet Jackson is on her sixth from the LP Control." Jackson subsequently became the first female artist to produce six top 40 hits on the Billboard Hot 100 from a single album. Los Angeles Times writer Paul Grein wrote a segment titled "The influence of Madonna and Janet Jackson", reporting Debbie Gibson's manager Doug Breitbart claimed "Madonna has brought back a really strong, melodic component to pop music", while Teen Beat editor Maggie Murphy remarked "Janet Jackson may have started this more than anyone else." Anthony DeCurtis, author of Present Tense: Rock & Roll and Culture (1992) wrote that "Madonna and Janet Jackson have produced videos that explore the female gaze," and described Jackson's music video for "Nasty" as feminist theory on film that deconstructs the objectification of women. Laura Sinagra documented that within two years of the release of Control, "a new crop of female singers (such as Paula Abdul and Karyn White) were charged with imitating Janet." Anthony DeCurtis of Rolling Stone remarked: "Control—with its quintuple-platinum sales and string of hit singles—established" a then-twenty-year-old Jackson "as one of the most popular recording artists in the world." The Guardian described the album's release as one of the 50 key events in the history of R&B and hip hop.

Upon the 30th anniversary of the album's release, Julian Kimble of Billboard magazine wrote: "In hindsight, Control is both evolutionary and revolutionary. As Jackson’s first album to land atop the Billboard 200, it marked professional and personal breakthroughs. Distancing herself from the immense Jackson family shadow, she created one of the most influential projects across contemporary R&B and pop music. And not only was Jackson’s maiden voyage with producers Jimmy Jam and Terry Lewis at the forefront of R&B, pop and hip-hop’s intersection, it birthed a novel sound in the process." Morgan Y. Evans for PopMatters wrote: "Janet Jackson's Control is worth reconsidering as, perhaps boldly, one of the top three or four pop records of the '80s...It is unquestionably the most coherent and powerful full album statement from any female solo pop artist during much of the '80s, some of Kate Bush's more eccentric triumphs that decade notwithstanding." Kyle Anderson of Entertainment Weekly commented: "The videos from Control were all over MTV, and Janet established herself as an instantly dominant pop figure talked about in the same sentences as Madonna and her older brother Michael." MTV's Meaghan Garvey asserted "it's hard to overstate the significance of Control, whether in terms of the pop landscape, the evolution of the music video as a vessel for promotion and expression, or Top 40 feminist anthems." She also argued "it's important to note that Control’s self-actualization anthems were expressions of black female pride. Control spawned a whopping six videos—great ones, at that—which played an immeasurable role in the shift toward visible black pop." Gerrick D. Kennedy of Los Angeles Times wrote that Jackson's continued influence is evident in the careers of Rihanna, Beyoncé, Ciara, FKA Twigs and Tinashe in that "all of them take cues from Jackson's blueprint. And all that began with Control." In 2016, a cassette of Control was added to the "Musical Crossroads" exhibition of the National Museum of African American History and Culture (NMAAHC).

 Track listing Notes'''
  signifies a co-producer

 Personnel 

 Janet Jackson – vocals, background vocals, keyboards, bells
 Melanie Andrews – background vocals
 Troy Anthony – saxophone
 Jerome Benton – vocals
 Spencer Bernard – synthesizer, guitar
 Geoff Bouchieiz – guitar
 Mark Cardenas – synthesizer
 Roger Dumas – drums, programming
 Jimmy Jam – synthesizer, percussion, piano, drums, vocals, background vocals
 Jellybean Johnson – guitar, vocals
 Lisa Keith – background vocals
 Terry Lewis – percussion, vocals, background vocals
 John McClain – executive producer
 Monte Moir – synthesizer, guitar, drums
 Nicholas Raths – acoustic and 12-string guitar
 Gwendolyn Traylor – background vocals
 Hami Wave – background vocals

 Charts 

 Weekly charts 

 Year-end charts 

 All-time chart 

 Certifications 

 See also 
 List of best-selling albums by women

 Notes 

 References 

 External links 
Control Video Page at janetjackson.com

 Further reading 

Cornwell, Jane. Janet Jackson''. Carlton Books, 2002. 

1986 albums
A&M Records albums
Albums produced by Jimmy Jam and Terry Lewis
Janet Jackson albums